Tetracha chilensis is a species of tiger beetle that was described by Laporte in 1834.

References

Cicindelidae
Beetles of South America
Beetles described in 1834